Guido Naumann (born 14 April 1968) is a retired German football midfielder.

References

1968 births
Living people
German footballers
FC Schalke 04 players
SG Wattenscheid 09 players
SV Darmstadt 98 players
Eintracht Braunschweig players
Alemannia Aachen players
2. Bundesliga players
Association football midfielders